Alexis Blin (born 16 September 1996) is a French professional footballer who plays as a defensive midfielder for  club Lecce.

Club career

Toulouse
Blin is a youth exponent from Le Mans but transferred to Ligue 1 side Toulouse in 2013. He made his Ligue 1 debut on 25 January 2015 against Evian Thonon Gaillard in a 1–0 away defeat. He played 85 minutes, before being substituted by Youssef Benali.

In September 2018, Blin joined league rivals Amiens on loan for the 2018–19 season with Amiens securing an option to sign him permanently.

Amiens
On 11 June 2019, Blin signed a three-year contract after previously being loaned with French club Amiens.

Lecce
On 23 June 2021, he signed a three-year contract with an option for fourth year with Italian Serie B club Lecce.

Career statistics

Club

References

External links
 
 

1996 births
Living people
Footballers from Le Mans
Association football midfielders
French footballers
France under-21 international footballers
France youth international footballers
Ligue 1 players
Ligue 2 players
Serie A players
Serie B players
Toulouse FC players
Amiens SC players
U.S. Lecce players
French expatriate footballers
French expatriate sportspeople in Italy
Expatriate footballers in Italy